KSLV may refer to:

 KSLV-FM, a radio station (96.5 FM) licensed to Del Norte, Colorado, United States
 KBGV, a radio station (1240 AM) licensed to Monte Vista, Colorado, which held the call sign KSLV from 1954 to 2019
 KYDN, a radio station (95.3 FM) licensed to Monte Vista, Colorado, which held the call sign KSLV-FM from June 1984 to September 2008
 Series of designations for Korean Space Launch Vehicle
Naro-1 (KSLV-1)
Nuri (rocket) (KSLV-II)
 KSLV Noh, a Phonk Artist, best known by his track Disaster

See also

 WSLV
 SLV (disambiguation)